A Girl Like Grace is a 2015 coming of age drama film directed by Ty Hodges.  It stars Ryan Destiny, Meagan Good, Raven-Symoné, Garcelle Beauvais, Romeo Miller and Paige Hurd.

Plot
Grace, a Haitian-American girl deals with issues like bullying at her school and a friend's suicide.

Cast
Ryan Destiny as Grace
Meagan Good as Share
Garcelle Beauvais as Lisa
Raven-Symoné as Mary
Paige Hurd as Andrea
Romeo Miller as Jason
Ty Hodges as Matt
Blair Redford as Billy

Release
The film was released on June 18, 2015 at the LA Film Festival.

Reception
Sandie Angulo Chen of Common Sense Media awarded the film two stars out of five and wrote, "Gritty, uneven coming-of-age drama has drugs, sex, violence."

Geoff Berkshire of Variety gave the film a negative review and wrote that it "comes on strong but lacks the experience or perspective to fully convince."

References

External links
 
 

2010s English-language films
2015 drama films
2010s coming-of-age drama films